The 2000 Star World Championships were held in Annapolis, United States between May 14 and 20, 2000.

Results

References

External links
 

Star World Championships
2000 in sailing
Star World Championships in the United States